This is a list of casinos in Arizona.  All of them are operated as Native American gaming facilities.

See also 
 List of casinos in the United States
 Arizona Department of Gaming

References

Arizona
Casinos